Jorun Marie Rypdal Kvernberg (born 10 July 1979) is a Norwegian traditional musician (hardingfele, violin, vocals) and composer, known from a series of recordings. She is the daughter of traditional musicians Liv Rypdal Kvernberg and Torbjørn Kvernberg, and the sister of classical musician Kari Kvernberg Dajani and jazz violinist Ola Kvernberg, and granddaughter of the fiddler and traditional music composer Peter L. Rypdal.

Career 

Kvernberg was born in Fræna, Romsdal, and studied traditional music at Norges Musikkhøgskole from 1999 to 2003. She also has practical pedagogical education from the same institution. She works as a freelance traditional fiddler, and released her first solo album, "Album" (2006) on the label ta:lik.

As a soloist Kvernberg is focused on the folk music from Møre og Romsdal, and she has since 2000 played in the bands Tindra and Majorstuen. Tindra has released four records, among them Den kvite hjorten (2009) with Helge Jordal. Majorstuen has released six albums, the first album Majorstuen (2002) was awarded Spellemannprisen 2003, the latest five albums were released on their own label, "Majorstuen Fiddlers Company" (MFC).

In addition, Kvernberg plays in a series of other bands, has toured worldwide, and has received the National Arts Scholarship 2009–10.

Honors 
2003: Awarded Spellemannprisen for the album Majorstuen (2002) in the class Traditional music, with "Majorstuen"
2003: Awarded "Øivind Berghs Minnepris"
2004: Winner of solo class at "Landsfestivalen for gamaldans"
2005: Winner of lanseringsprogrammet INTROfolk05, with "Majorstuen"
2005: Winner of Kvartsprisen, with "Tindra"
2005: Winner of TONO's Edvard Prize for the work ”Då kom du” (When you arrived), the first award to the Traditional Norwegian folk music genere
2007: Winner of "Vestlandskappleiken", open class (solo)
2007: Winner of "Folkelarmprisen" for the record Trillar for to class Innovative, with Bruvoll-Halvorsen
2008: Best Dance Play at "Landskappleiken" 2008 (solo)
2010: Awarded Spellemannprisen 2010 for the album Keramello in the class Traditional music, with Unni Boksasp Ensemble
2010: Winner of fiddler solo class (fiddle/hardingfele) at "Landsfestivalen for gamaldans"
2010: Winner of "Folkelarmprisen" for the record Keramello class Traditional, with Unni Boksasp Ensemble

Discography

Solo works 
2006: Album (Ta:lik), with slåtter (traditional tunes) from Møre og Romsdal
2013: Tidens Løsen (Ta:lik), with accordeonplayer Øyvind Sandum with slåtter (traditional tunes) after Ole P. Blø

Collaborative works 
Within Majorstuen
2002: Majorstuen (2L)
2004: Jorun jogga (MFC)
2006: Juledrøm (MFC)
2010: Skir (MFC)
2013: Live in Concert (MFC)
2015: Kvitre (MFC)

Within Tindra
2006: Lukkeleg vaking (Ta:lik)
2009: Den kvite hjorten (Ta:lik), with Helge Jordal
2011: Moder Norge (Ta:lik)
2011: Live in Førde (Ta:lik), with Kroke

With others
2002: Inger Lise (Master Music, 2001), with Inger Lise Rypdal
2005: Home Sweet Home (Odeon/EMI, 2005), with Liv Marit Wedvik
2007: Klassisk Kalvik (Daworks, 2002), with Finn Kalvik
2007: Trillar for to (Grappa Music), with Bruvoll/Halvorsen
2007: Mot nye høyder (Tylden og co, 2007), Bjørns Orkester
2007: Songar frå Havdal (ta:lik), Unni Boksasp
2007: Jarnnetter (ta:lik), Camilla Granlien Band
2010: Keramello (Øra Musikk), Unni Boksasp Ensemble
2013: Kvite fuglar (UBE), Unni Boksasp Ensemble
2013: Valseria (Etnisk Musikklubb), Gabriel Fliflet

References

External links 

20th-century Norwegian violinists
21st-century Norwegian violinists
Norwegian folk musicians
People from Fræna
1979 births
Living people
Musicians from Møre og Romsdal
20th-century Norwegian women singers
20th-century Norwegian singers
21st-century Norwegian women singers
21st-century Norwegian singers